Lac du Vernois is a lake at Le Frasnois, in the Jura department of France.

Vernois